Noelle Montcalm (born 3 April 1988) is a Canadian athlete specializing in the 400 metres hurdles. She competed at the 2013 World Championships, where she failed to qualify for the semifinals. Her personal best in the event is 55.82s, set in Edmonton in 2016. She was a member of Canada's Olympic team at the 2016 Summer Olympics in Rio de Janeiro. She subsequently competed at the 2020 Summer Olympics as well.

Competition record

References

External links
 

1988 births
Living people
Athletes (track and field) at the 2014 Commonwealth Games
Commonwealth Games competitors for Canada
Sportspeople from Windsor, Ontario
Canadian female hurdlers
Athletes (track and field) at the 2016 Summer Olympics
Olympic track and field athletes of Canada
Universiade medalists in athletics (track and field)
Universiade silver medalists for Canada
Canadian Track and Field Championships winners
Medalists at the 2013 Summer Universiade
Athletes (track and field) at the 2020 Summer Olympics
20th-century Canadian women
21st-century Canadian women